Episcopal Church of the Transfiguration may refer to:

in the United States
(by state)
Episcopal Church of the Transfiguration (Arcadia, California)
Episcopal Church of the Transfiguration (Vail, Colorado)
Episcopal Church of the Transfiguration (Belle Plaine, Minnesota)
Episcopal Church of the Transfiguration (Dallas, Texas)

See also
Church of the Transfiguration (disambiguation)